The abbreviation NEIC may refer to:

 Nash equilibrium incentive compatibility, see 
 National Earthquake Information Center
 Navy Expeditionary Intelligence Command, a component of Navy Expeditionary Combat Command
 Nigerian National Economic Intelligence Committee, see Garba Ali Mohammed
 Nordic e-Infrastructure Collaboration, see 
 Northeast Illinois Council, an administrative district of the Boy Scouts of America
 Northeast Iowa Conference